is a metro station located in Nishi-ku, Yokohama, Kanagawa, Japan operated by the Yokohama Municipal Subway’s Blue Line (Line 3). It is 21.6 kilometers from the terminal of the Blue Line at Shōnandai Station.

History
Takashimachō Station was originally opened as a station on the Keihin Line (presently the Keihin-Tōhoku Line), the first electrified service between Tokyo and Yokohama, on December 20, 1914. The station was renamed  when services began on the Tōkaidō Main Line  on August 15, 1915 with the original Yokohama Station renamed . The station was connected to the Tokyo Yokohama Railway (present-day Tōkyū Tōyoko Line) on May 18, 1928; however, the Tokyo Yokohama Railway renamed its station  on August 8, 1928. The JNR moved Yokohama Station (and the Tōkaidō Main Line) north to the current location, thereby ending its service here on October 15, 1928, and the station reverted to its original name of Takashimachō Station on January 20, 1931.

On September 4, 1976 the underground station for the Yokohama Municipal Subway Blue Line was completed. 

The above-ground Tōyoko Line ceased operations to this station on January 31, 2004.  On the following day, February 1, 2004, Shin-Takashima Station on the newly-constructed Minatomirai Line opened, with through service to the Tōyoko Line available from that station instead, about 800 meters away.  Since that time, as of March 2023, only the Municipal Subway Blue Line service remains at Takashimachō Station.

Lines
Yokohama Municipal Subway
Blue Line

Station layout
Takashimachō Station has a single island platform serving two tracks, located four stories underground.

Platforms

See also
Shin-Takashima Station

References
 Harris, Ken and Clarke, Jackie. Jane's World Railways 2008-2009. Jane's Information Group (2008).

External links

 Takashimachō Station (Blue Line) 

Railway stations in Kanagawa Prefecture
Railway stations in Japan opened in 1914
Blue Line (Yokohama)